Grinning Streak  is the tenth full-length original-material studio album by Barenaked Ladies, released on 4 June 2013 on Vanguard Records. It is the band's first album on Vanguard. The album is the band's second studio album since the departure of founding member Steven Page in February 2009. The album was recorded February–April 2013 in separate sessions with Howie Beck and Gavin Brown The first single, "Boomerang" was recorded in a separate session produced by Brown in May 2012, initially for release that summer.

Commercial performance
Grinning Streak debuted at  10 on the Billboard 200 chart, selling 26,000 copies in its first week. It is the band's highest position on the chart since their album Everything to Everyone also debuted at  10 in 2003. Grinning Streak also debuted at  12 on Canada's Top Album Chart, and  101 on the UK Albums Chart. The album has sold 68,000 copies in the US as of May 2015.

Released versions
Grinning Streak was released in CD and digital download format, as well as a vinyl edition, which was made available for sale at the Last Summer on Earth 2013 shows.

Versions with bonus tracks were released on the Canadian iTunes Store, and in a Target-exclusive version in the United States; the former including an extra remix not included in the latter.

On 1 July 2014, a new Grinning Streak Deluxe digital package was released in the U.S.s including the three bonus tracks from the Target edition, along with three newly recorded acoustics. These new tracks were released in Canada on The Long Weekend EP. Additionally, a live version of "Did I Say That Out Loud?" is included on The Long Weekend EP, but not on the Grinning Streak Deluxe digital package.

Track listing

Personnel
Jim Creeggan – double bass, electric bass, background vocals, lead vocals ("Who Knew?")
Kevin Hearn – piano, synthesizers, keyboards, celeste, accordion, melodica, acoustic and electric guitars, mandolin, banjo, background vocals, lead vocals ("Daydreaming") 
Ed Robertson – lead vocals, acoustic and electric guitars, Magnus air organ, background vocals
Tyler Stewart – drums, percussion, background vocals

Additional:
Gavin Brown – programming
John Scholz – trenchwork
Chris Stapleton – starring as being Stapes
Nora Patterson – background vocals ("Odds Are")

Charts

References

2013 albums
Barenaked Ladies albums
Vanguard Records albums
Albums produced by Howie Beck
Albums produced by Gavin Brown (musician)
Albums recorded at Noble Street Studios